Oriovac is a village and municipality in Brod-Posavina County, Croatia. It had 6,559 inhabitants in 2001.

Geography 
The municipality is divided in 10 naselja:

Bečic  
Ciglenik 
Kujnik 
Lužani 
Malino 
Oriovac 
Pričac
Radovanje 
Slavonski Kobaš 
Živike

History 

Until 1918, Oriovac (named ORIOWACZ before 1850)  was part of the Austrian monarchy (Kingdom of Croatia-Slavonia after the compromise of 1867), in the Slavonian Military Frontier, Gradiskaner Regiment  N°VIII before its dissolution in 1881.

See also
Oriovac railway station

References

 
 Povijest općine Oriovac 

Populated places in Brod-Posavina County
Slavonia
Municipalities of Croatia